Captain Frederick Thornton "Fritz" Peters,  & Bar (17 September 1889 – 13 November 1942) was a Canadian-born sailor in the Royal Navy and a recipient of the Victoria Cross, the highest award for valour in the face of the enemy that can be awarded to British and Commonwealth forces.

Early life and career
Fritz Peters' parents were Frederick Peters (Premier of Prince Edward Island, 1891–1897) and Roberta Hamilton Susan Gray (daughter of John Hamilton Gray, who was Premier of Prince Edward Island at the time of the Charlottetown Conference of 1864). He was educated at St. Peter's School on Prince Edward Island, at school in British Columbia and at Naval College in England. Two of Peters' brothers died in action on the Western Front during the First World War—John Francklyn Peters in April 1915 and Gerald Hamilton Peters in June 1916.

Peters entered the Royal Navy as midshipman in 1905 and began the First World War as a lieutenant. He retired in 1919 at the age of thirty as a commander, having won the Distinguished Service Order and the Distinguished Service Cross (DSC) during the war. Peters then split his time between Britain, Canada and the Gold Coast.

Second World War
In October 1939 Peters re-volunteered for Royal Navy service. He was made the commander of an anti-submarine flotilla. In 1940 he was awarded a Bar to his DSC and was later appointed acting captain for special services.

Peters was 53 years old, and a captain in the Royal Navy during the Second World War when the following deed took place for which he was awarded the VC:

Operation Reservist (part of Operation Torch, the Allied landings in French North Africa) was an attempt to capture Oran Harbour, Algeria and prevent it from being sabotaged by its French garrison.

On 8 November 1942 Captain Peters, commanding in Walney, led his force through the boom towards the jetty in the face of point-blank fire from shore batteries, the sloop , and the destroyer . Blinded in one eye, he alone of 11 officers and men on the bridge survived. Besides him, 13 ratings survived Walney sinking. The destroyer reached the jetty disabled and ablaze and went down with her colours flying. Captain Peters and a handful of men managed to reach the shore, where they were taken prisoner. The survivors, like those of Walney, were taken prisoner as they reached shore.

Captain Peters was also awarded the United States Army's Distinguished Service Cross for the same actions.  The citation, issued in Allied Force Headquarters General Orders No. 19 23 November 1942, stated that:

The survivors were released on 10 November 1942 when the French garrison surrendered. In the meantime, the French systematically destroyed the harbour facilities at Oran: Operation Reservist was thus a complete failure.

In addition to his service with the Royal Navy, Fritz worked with British Naval Intelligence and advised Prime Minister Winston Churchill. British double agent Kim Philby noted his admiration for Secret Intelligence Service instruction leader "Commander Peters" in his book My Silent War.

Death
Captain Peters was killed in an air crash three days after his release, on 13 November 1942. He was coming back to Britain in a Sunderland flying boat, which crash-landed in Plymouth Sound in thick fog, at the entrance to the Royal Navy's Devonport Dockyard, near Plymouth, Devon. In spite of efforts by the pilot, Flight Lieutenant Wynton Thorpe, RAAF, who held on to him for ninety minutes in the water, he was dead when the rescue launch reached them. He has no known grave and is remembered on the Portsmouth Naval Memorial, (Panel 61. Column 3) Hampshire, England.

Mount Peters near Nelson, British Columbia, where his mother lived in her last years with the family of her daughter Helen Dewdney and her husband E.E.L. Dewdney, was named in his honour in 1946. A display of photos and panels on his life is on the main floor of the Daniel J. MacDonald Building in Charlottetown, Prince Edward Island.  His name, along with the names of his three brothers who served in the First World War, is on memorial plaques in the St. Peter's Anglican Church in Charlottetown.

In 2012, a biography by Peters' great-nephew Sam McBride, based on family letters and titled The Bravest Canadian – Fritz Peters VC: The Making of a Hero of Two World Wars, was published by Granville Island Publishing. The book earned a Heritage Award from the PEI Heritage Foundation and first place in the B.C. Genealogical Society's 2012 family history book awards.

References

External links
 Captain F.T. Peters in The Art of War exhibition at the UK National Archives
 Canadian Government website biography and citation: PETERS, Frederick Thornton
 
 Legion Magazine Article on Frederick Peters

1889 births
1942 deaths
Canadian Companions of the Distinguished Service Order
Naval history of Canada
Royal Navy officers of World War II
Canadian World War II recipients of the Victoria Cross
Royal Navy recipients of the Victoria Cross
People from Charlottetown
Recipients of the Distinguished Service Cross (United Kingdom)
Recipients of the Distinguished Service Cross (United States)
Royal Navy officers of World War I
Royal Navy personnel killed in World War II
Victims of aviation accidents or incidents in England
Canadian military personnel from Prince Edward Island
Canadian recipients of the Distinguished Service Cross (United Kingdom)
People educated at Bedford School